Sui Xinmei (隋新梅, born January 29, 1965) is a Chinese shot putter who won the silver medal at the 1996 Summer Olympics in Atlanta.

She also won the 1991 IAAF World Indoor Championships as well as the Asian Games in 1990 and 1994 and the Asian Championships in 1995. She won silver medals at the 1998 Asian Championships and the 1997 East Asian Games.

Her personal best of 21.66 m, thrown in Beijing in 1990, ranks her 10th on the shot put all-time lists.

International competitions

See also
List of sportspeople sanctioned for doping offences

External links

1965 births
Living people
Chinese female shot putters
Olympic athletes of China
Olympic silver medalists for China
Athletes (track and field) at the 1996 Summer Olympics
Asian Games gold medalists for China
Asian Games medalists in athletics (track and field)
Athletes (track and field) at the 1990 Asian Games
Athletes (track and field) at the 1994 Asian Games
Chinese sportspeople in doping cases
Doping cases in athletics
Medalists at the 1996 Summer Olympics
Olympic silver medalists in athletics (track and field)
Goodwill Games medalists in athletics
Medalists at the 1990 Asian Games
Medalists at the 1994 Asian Games
World Athletics Indoor Championships winners
Competitors at the 1994 Goodwill Games
20th-century Chinese women